The 2008 LPGA Championship was the 54th LPGA Championship, played June 5–8 at Bulle Rock Golf Course in Havre de Grace, Maryland. This was the second of four major championships on the LPGA Tour in 2008.

The champion was tour rookie Yani Tseng, age 19, with a playoff victory over Maria Hjorth. The two finished regulation play at 276 (−12), one stroke ahead of Annika Sörenstam and Lorena Ochoa.  Tseng birdied the fourth extra hole for her first career win on the LPGA Tour and became the first rookie to win a major in a decade.

This championship was played at Bulle Rock for five consecutive seasons, 2005 through 2009.

Past champions in the field

Made the cut

Source:

Missed the cut

Source:

Round summaries

First round
Thursday, June 5, 2008

Second round
Friday, June 6, 2008

Third round
Saturday, June 7, 2008

Final round
Sunday, June 8, 2008

Source:

Scorecard
Final round

Cumulative tournament scores, relative to par
{|class="wikitable" span = 50 style="font-size:85%;
|-
|style="background: Pink;" width=10|
|Birdie
|style="background: PaleGreen;" width=10|
|Bogey
|style="background: Green;" width=10|
|Double bogey
|style="background: Olive;" width=10|
|Triple bogey+
|}

Playoff

Scorecard

Cumulative playoff scores, relative to par

Source:

References

External links
Golf Observer leaderboard

Women's PGA Championship
Golf in Maryland
LPGA Championship
LPGA Championship
LPGA Championship
LPGA Championship